Marcela Guirado (born 24 October 1989) is a Mexican actress and singer. Born in Guadalajara Jalisco, Mexico, Guirado is best known for her works in telenovelas with the Mexican television channel TV Azteca. Recently she has been made known to the Latin American market with the telenovela of Telemundo, Silvana sin lana, and with the series based on the boxer Julio César Chávez entitled ''El César.

Personal life 
In November 2016, Guirado married American actor and singer Vince Miranda after a three-year relationship.
They announced they were getting a divorce in July 2019.

Filmography

References

External links 
 

Mexican telenovela actresses
1989 births
Living people